Abbot's Meads is a suburb of Chester in Cheshire, England.  Abbot's Meads is north-west of Chester city centre. The Countess of Chester Hospital is nearby. The population as taken in the 2011 census can be found under Chester.

References

Villages in Cheshire
Areas of Chester